Namakagon can refer to:

Namakagon, Wisconsin 
Namakagon River, a river that runs through Bayfield County, Wisconsin
Lake Namakagon, a lake in Wisconsin
USS Namakagon, a gas tanker that served in the US Navy

See also
Namak (disambiguation)
Nema kajanja
Nematicon